The CARIFTA Aquatics Championships is an annual, age-group aquatics championships for the Caribbean. It has been held since 1985, and is similar in form/origin to the track & field/athletics event: the CARIFTA Games. The event is held under the auspices of CANOC, the Caribbean Association of National Olympic Committees.

The 30th edition of the aquatics championships was held in April 2015 in Bridgetown, Barbados.

Musician Sean Paul participated in the 1989 and 1991 editions of the championships, as part of the Jamaican water polo team.

Editions

CARIFTA Swimming Championships records
All records were set in finals unless noted otherwise. All times are swum in a long-course (50m) pool.

Boys (11–12)

Girls (11–12)

Mixed relay (13–14)

Boys (13–14)

Girls (13–14)

Boys (15–17)

Girls (15–17)

See also
Caribbean Free Trade Association (CARIFTA)
Caribbean Island Swimming Championships (CISCs)
Central American and Caribbean Swimming Championships (CCCANs)

References

External links
CARIFTA Championships records
CARIFTA results page (with 2004–2018 swimming results) on the Bahamas Swimming Federation website.

CARIFTA
International sports competitions in the Caribbean